JustiServ is a Boston, United States, based online legal marketplace that allows people to compare the prices and experiences of attorneys on its site. JustiServ has been selected to be a part of Highland Capital Partners' 2015 Summer@Highland, a startup accelerator which helps student entrepreneurs build their companies over the summer.

Founding 

JustiServ was launched in 2014 by Michael Gants, Harvard graduate and son of Chief Justice of the Massachusetts Supreme Court Ralph Gants. As a child, Michael Gants suffered from a chronic illness. Gants recognized that it was his mother's expertise as a lawyer that ensured that he received the health care and education that he needed. This experience motivated the creation of a tool which would make legal resources more widely available and affordable.

Legal pricing on JustiServ 

JustiServ allows consumers to compare prices of attorneys online. Gants says, “[Without JustiServ] you have to call around to different lawyers and they tell you $100 or $200 per hour. Once you sign up with a lawyer, you don’t know what they should be charging you for... it doesn’t make any sense.”  By asking consumers to answer a few short multiple choice questions about their case, JustiServ is able to give flat rate estimates for legal cases. Traditionally, when lawyers give hourly rates, consumers have difficulty predicting how much a case will end up costing them, as many have little idea how long their case will take.

The future of technology and the law 

Sarah Reed (Harvard Law '91 and COO of MPM Capital) believes the legal field should embrace the opportunity to match clients and attorneys over the Internet and offers JustiServ as an example of this in practice.

Heidi Alexander of the Massachusetts Law Office Management Assistance Program says that an online marketplace like JustiServ "not only aims to benefit consumers, but also to help solo and small firm attorneys build their client base".

Rebecca Strong, staff writer for BostInno, says that while it's nearly impossible to predict which tech startups will succeed, JustiServ is one of the Boston tech's scene most "promising contenders". She goes on to say that JustiServ "eliminates a lot of the confusion by providing fixed price estimates for lawyers, allowing users to get a more accurate idea of what they’ll need to spend". and that "users can search with reassurance, too, that they’re in good hands. Gants spoke with leaders at a number of bar associations in order to get introduced to those who are reputable."

As of April 2018, JustiServ is defunct.

References 

Consumer guides